Fred Ray Dorsey (January 19, 1930 – October 26, 2017) was an American politician. He served as a Republican member for the 42nd district of the North Carolina House of Representatives.

Life and career 
Dorsey was born in Buncombe County, North Carolina, the son of Jessie Hensley and Fredrick Dorsey. He was president of the North Carolina Wildlife Federation.

Dorsey served three terms for the 42nd district of the North Carolina House of Representatives. He served until 1979, when he was succeeded by Ralph William Ledford. He was a soldier.

Dorsey died in October 2017, at the age of 87.

References 

1930 births
2017 deaths
People from Buncombe County, North Carolina
Republican Party members of the North Carolina House of Representatives
20th-century American politicians